Janet Hill Gordon (January 11, 1915 – September 17, 1990) was an American lawyer and politician. Born Janet Hill in Manhattan, she was the daughter of James P. Hill (1878–1950) and Florine Hill. Her father was Presiding Justice of the New York Supreme Court, Appellate Division (3rd Dept.) from 1933 to 1948. She graduated from Syracuse University and Brooklyn Law School. She practiced law in Norwich, Chenango County, New York. She married William J. Gordon (died 1975) who was Judge and Surrogate of Chenango County, and their only daughter is Gail Hill Gordon (born 1950).

Janet Hill Gordon was a member of the New York State Assembly (Chenango Co.) from 1947 to 1958, sitting in the 166th, 167th, 168th, 169th, 170th and 171st New York State Legislatures.

She was a member of the New York State Senate from 1959 to 1962, sitting in the 172nd and 173rd New York State Legislatures. In November 1962, she ran for Congress in the 35th District, but was defeated by Democrat Samuel S. Stratton.

She died on September 17, 1990, in Upstate Medical Center in Syracuse, New York, of a heart attack; and was buried at the Mount Hope Cemetery in Norwich.

Sources

External links

Republican Party members of the New York State Assembly
Republican Party New York (state) state senators
People from Norwich, New York
1990 deaths
Syracuse University alumni
Brooklyn Law School alumni
1915 births
Women state legislators in New York (state)
20th-century American politicians
20th-century American women politicians